Thulth Ghahyan is a sub-district located in Kharif District, 'Amran Governorate, Yemen. Thulth Ghahyan had a population of 2027 according to the 2004 census.

References 

Sub-districts in Kharif District